Kamaraj Nagar is a legislative assembly constituency in the Union territory of Puducherry in India. Kamaraj Nagar assembly constituency was part of Puducherry (Lok Sabha constituency).

Segments
Brindavanam, Kamaraj Nagar, Krishna Nagar, Rainbow Nagar, Sithankudi, Venkata Nagar and Venkateshwara Nagar.

Members of Legislative Assembly

By election

ELection Result

2021 Assembly election

References

External links
 

Assembly constituencies of Puducherry
Monuments and memorials to Kamaraj